Charles Schusterman (1935–2000) was a Tulsa-born American businessman and philanthropist. He was the founder of the Samson Investment Company, a privately owned oil and gas company with oil field investments in the United States, Canada, Venezuela and Russia. He was a large donor to Jewish causes in the United States and Israel. He and his wife, Lynn Schusterman, founded the Charles and Lynn Schusterman Family Foundation.

Early life
Schusterman was born to a Jewish family in 1935 in the Soviet Union. He emigrated to the United States as a child with his family. He had a brother, Dan and a sister, Ruth (Poznik). He grew up in Tulsa, Oklahoma, where he graduated from Central High School. Schusterman graduated from the University of Oklahoma, where he received a bachelor of science degree in petroleum engineering. He subsequently served in the United States Army.

Career
Schusterman started his career in the oil industry in Oklahoma by entering into an oil field salvage business. In 1961, he began acquiring and operating marginal oil leases. In 1971, he borrowed US$30,000 from his mother and founded the Samson Investment Company, a privately owned oil and gas company. The company was named in honor of Samson, a Biblical figure, as well as for his father, who had died in 1954. His investments included oil fields in the United States, but also in Canada, Venezuela and Russia.

Philanthropy
With his wife, Schusterman co-founded the Charles and Lynn Schusterman Family Foundation. They donated millions to his alma mater, the University of Oklahoma; the Parent Child Center of Tulsa; and the Israel Arts and Science Academy in Jerusalem, Israel. The largest single gift was $10 million, made in 1999, which helped OU buy the former Amoco Research Center at 41st and Yale in Tulsa. The Amoco property, which included  of land, has since been developed into the Schusterman Health Sciences Center.

With Edgar Bronfman, Sr. and Michael Steinhardt, Schusterman co-founded the Synagogue Transformation and Renewal. Their goal was to revive synagogue attendance across the United States.

Personal life
Schusterman married Lynn Schusterman, a philanthropist. They had two sons, Hal and Jay, and a daughter, Stacy H. Schusterman. They resided in Tulsa.

Death and legacy
Schusterman was first diagnosed with chronic myelogenous leukemia (CML) in 1983. The immediate cause of death was acute respiratory distress syndrome (ARDS). His funeral was held at Temple Israel in Tulsa. He was inducted into the Oklahoma Hall of Fame in November 2000. The Charles Schusterman Jewish Community Center in Tulsa was named in his honor.

Awards and honors
 Charles and Lynn received the 1996 Philanthropist of the Year Award from the Oklahoma Chapter of the National Society of Fund Raising Executives.
 Charles received the Humanitarian Award from the National Jewish Center for Immunology and Respiratory Medicine. 
 Schusterman was inducted into the Oklahoma Hall of Fame in November 2000.
 The Tulsa Global Alliance gave Charles its Global Vision Award.

Notes

References

External sources
 Charles and Lynn Schusterman Family Foundation Charles and Lynn Schusterman Family Foundation.

1945 births
2000 deaths
Businesspeople from Tulsa, Oklahoma
Soviet emigrants to the United States
American company founders
Jewish American philanthropists
Philanthropists from Oklahoma
American Reform Jews
Deaths from leukemia
American businesspeople in the oil industry
20th-century American philanthropists
20th-century American businesspeople
20th-century American Jews